Martha Williams is an American attorney and government official who is the current director of the United States Fish and Wildlife Service. She previously served as the 24th director of the Montana Department of Fish, Wildlife and Parks from 2017 to 2020.

Education 
Williams graduated from Garrison Forest School in Owings Mills, Maryland, then earned a bachelor's degree from the University of Virginia and a Juris Doctor from the Alexander Blewett III School of Law at the University of Montana.

Career 
From 1998 to 2011, Williams served as legal counsel to the Montana Department of Fish, Wildlife and Parks. She has also served as deputy solicitor of the United States Fish and Wildlife Service. Williams worked as associate professor of law at the University of Montana and co-director of the university's Land Use and Natural Resources Clinic.

References 

Living people
Montana lawyers
State cabinet secretaries of Montana
University of Virginia alumni
University of Montana alumni
University of Montana faculty
United States Fish and Wildlife Service personnel
United States Department of the Interior officials
Year of birth missing (living people)
Biden administration personnel
Garrison Forest School people